Polyterpnes is a monotypic snout moth genus described by Alfred Jefferis Turner in 1932. Its one species, Polyterpnes polyrrhoda, was described by Turner in the same paper.

References

Chrysauginae
Pyralidae genera
Monotypic moth genera